Teodor Heba (10 June 1914 – 30 May 2001) was an Albanian politician who served as Chairman of the People's Assembly of Albania from 1950–1951.

Early life 
Teodor Heba was born in Tirana on 10 June 1914. At the age of 11, he emigrated to Romania where he attended middle school and completed a 4 class superior trade school. In 1933, he returns to Albania and joins the Communist Group of Shkodër. He became a member of the Communist Party of Albania in 1941. The following year, Heba was arrested by the fascist authorities and was sentenced to 14 years imprisonment. He managed to escape from prison in July 1943.

Political career 
After the war, Heba was heavily involved in politics. He became a member of the Albanian Investigative Committee at the United Nations and later was elected as a member of the People's Assembly for the period from 1950–1954 and served as Chairman of the Assembly from 28 June 1950 until 6 June 1951 where he was relieved of his duties. Heba died on 30 May 2001 at the age of 86.

References

1914 births	
2001 deaths
Speakers of the Parliament of Albania
Members of the Parliament of Albania
Labour Party of Albania politicians